Zackary Bowman (born November 18, 1984) is a retired American football cornerback. He was drafted by the Chicago Bears in the fifth round of the 2008 NFL Draft. He played college football at Nebraska and New Mexico Military Institute. He has also played for the New York Giants and Miami Dolphins.

Early years
Bowman attended Batesburg-Leesville High in Batesburg, South Carolina, and later attended Bartlett High School in Anchorage, Alaska, and graduated in 2003.

College career
After Bowman attended New Mexico Military Institute, he attended University of Nebraska–Lincoln. In his two seasons at Nebraska Bowman had a total of 56 tackles, 20 pass break ups, 3 interceptions, and he played in 22 games, 9 of which he started.

Bowman had to redshirt the 2006 season due to torn anterior cruciate ligament in his left knee on the third day of fall practice and missed the season.

Professional career

Chicago Bears
The Chicago Bears selected in the fifth round of the 2008 NFL Draft. He made the team's opening day roster but was relegated to the practice squad to make room for guard Dan Buenning, who was acquired in a trade. The Bears signed Bowman off the practice squad in week seven, after their top three cornerbacks were ruled out of a game against the Minnesota Vikings due to injuries. Bowman played a crucial role in the Bears victory over the Vikings by recovering a fumbled punt in the endzone for a touchdown. Bowman sustained an injury in the fourth quarter, which should have left him sidelined for the remainder of the game, but he insisted on returning due to the Bears shallow depth at the cornerback position. He recorded his first career interception upon returning, which also prevented the Vikings from engineering a last second touchdown drive. Bowman required surgery to repair the injury he sustained during the game, and was placed on the team's injury reserve for the remainder of the season. His efforts during the week merited him the "NFC Special Teams Player of the Week" Award.

In training camp 2009, coaches were very impressed with Bowman's abilities and play on the practice field. Despite missing most of the preseason with a hamstring injury, Bowman was expected to be a key part of the Bears secondary in 2009 with teammates Nathan Vasher and Charles Tillman.

In Week 2 of the regular season, Bowman took over Vasher's starting spot at cornerback. He recorded 66 tackles, six interceptions, and one forced fumble over the course of the season.

During the Bears 2010 mini camp, head coach Lovie Smith announced that Bowman would replace Charles Tillman as the team's left side cornerback. In a typical Cover 2 defense, team's will usually place their best cornerback on the left side of their defensive formations.

Minnesota Vikings
Bowman signed a one-year deal with the Minnesota Vikings on March 26, 2012.  On September 2, 2012, he was waived to make room for A. J. Jefferson.

Second stint with Chicago
Bowman was later re-signed by the Bears. In Week 16 against the Arizona Cardinals, Bowman recovered Beanie Wells' fumble in the endzone for a Bears touchdown, as the Bears won 28–13. In 2013, Bowman was an unrestricted free agent, but signed a one-year deal with the Bears. During the season, Bowman played in all 16 games while starting in seven, and recorded 49 tackles along with three interceptions.

New York Giants
On March 31, 2014, Bowman signed a one-year deal with the New York Giants.

Miami Dolphins
On April 13, 2015, Bowman signed a deal with the Miami Dolphins. He was released on September 6, however, re-signed later that day. He was waived on November 24.

Personal life
Bowman was a sociology major and earned his degree in December 2007. He is married and has three sons.

References

External links
New York Giants bio
Minnesota Vikings bio
Chicago Bears bio
Nebraska Cornhuskers bio

1984 births
Living people
Players of American football from Anchorage, Alaska
Players of American football from Columbia, South Carolina
American football cornerbacks
American football safeties
Nebraska Cornhuskers football players
Chicago Bears players
Minnesota Vikings players
New York Giants players
Miami Dolphins players